Java Rockin'land (known as Java Rockingland) is a 3-day rock festival held each year in the lakeside of Carnaval Beach, Ancol Dreamland, Jakarta.

Java Rockin'land's fact 2009-2012

References

Rock festivals in Indonesia